Aruvapakkam is an Indian Panchayat village located in Vanur  taluk of Villupuram district in the state of Tamil Nadu.

References

Villages in Viluppuram district